The Dianne, also known as NW 11th and Hoyt, is a high-rise residential building in Portland, Oregon's Pearl District, in the United States. Construction began in May 2016 and was completed in April 2018.

The building was a 2018 TopProjects finalist.

References

External links
 
 

2018 establishments in Oregon
Residential buildings completed in 2018
Pearl District, Portland, Oregon
Skyscrapers in Portland, Oregon